Grigorios Vegleris was Prince of Samos briefly in 1912, succeeding the assassinated Andreas Kopasis. With the outbreak of the First Balkan War in October 1912, the exiled Samian political leader Themistoklis Sophoulis returned to the island and assumed control, declaring its union with the Kingdom of Greece.

Princes of Samos
1948 deaths
20th-century rulers in Europe
Constantinopolitan Greeks
Politicians from Istanbul